Mount Murphy is a massive, snow-covered  and highly eroded shield volcano in Marie Byrd Land of West Antarctica with steep, rocky slopes. It is directly south of Bear Peninsula and is bounded by the Smith, Pope and Haynes Glaciers. Volcanic activity began in the Miocene with the eruption of basaltic and trachytic lava. Volcanism on the slopes of the volcano resumed much later during the Pleistocene, with a parasitic cone having been K–Ar dated to 0.9 million years old.

Delineated from aerial photographs taken by US Navy Operation Highjump in January 1947. Named by US-ACAN for Robert Cushman Murphy of the American Museum of Natural History, noted authority on Antarctic and sub-Antarctic bird life. While serving on the whaler, he charted the Bay of Isles region of South Georgia.

Features
Buettner Peak is a sharp peak rising midway along the north wall of Roos Glacier in the northwest part of the Mount Murphy massif.

See also
 List of volcanoes in Antarctica
 List of Ultras of Antarctica

References

Sources

External links
 "Mount Murphy, Antarctica" on Peakbagger

Polygenetic shield volcanoes
Volcanoes of Marie Byrd Land
Mount Murphy
Pleistocene shield volcanoes